National Audiovisual Institute (or ) is a governmental bureau under the Finnish Ministry of Education responsible for supervising the distribution of audiovisual content (including video games), advancing media education in Finland and archiving audiovisual material. The agency is tasked with maintaining and developing an online content rating system, training independent classifiers and supervising their operation.

The agency was formed in 2014 as a result of a merger between the National Audiovisual Archive (formerly Finnish Film Archive, established 1957) and the Finnish Board of Film Classification and its short-lived successor Centre for Media Education and Audiovisual Media (2012–2014).

The National Audiovisual Institute organizes regular archival film screenings at the Kino Regina cinema, located since 2019 in the Helsinki Central Library Oodi.

See also

References

External links 
 National Audiovisual Institute
 Rating information

Video game content ratings systems
Cultural organisations based in Finland
Film organisations in Finland
Sound archives
Censorship in Finland
Motion picture rating systems
Entertainment rating organizations
Film archives in Europe
2014 establishments in Finland
Archives in Finland